Heliolonche modicella is a species of moth of the family Noctuidae. It is found in North America, including California.

The wingspan is about 18 mm. The adults are day-flying.

External links
Images

Heliothinae